Fryer Point is the northern point of Bristol Island in the South Sandwich Islands. It was charted in 1930 by Discovery Investigations personnel on the Discovery II and named for Lieutenant Commander D.H. Fryer, Royal Navy, captain of H.M. Surveying Ship Fitzroy.

References

Headlands of South Georgia and the South Sandwich Islands